Heritage Island can mean:

Kingman Island or Heritage Island, an island in Kingman Lake in Washington, D.C., United States
Heritage USA, a defunct Christian theme park in Fort Mill, South Carolina, which contained a water park named Heritage Island